Argonauta cornuta is a species of pelagic octopus belonging to the genus Argonauta.  The female of the species, like all argonauts, creates a paper-thin eggcase that coils around the octopus reminiscent of the way a nautilus lives in its shell (hence the name paper nautilus).  The shell is usually approximately 80 mm in length, although it can exceed 90 mm in exceptional specimens; the world record size is 98.6 mm.

This species seems to have a relatively limited distribution confined to the waters surrounding Western Mexico and Baja California.  For this reason, it is considered one of the rarest of the Argonauta species.

The taxonomic status of this species is questionable. Further research is needed to determine whether it is a valid species or a synonym of the highly variable A. hians.

The type locality of A. cornuta is unknown. The type specimen is deposited at the Academy of Natural Sciences in Philadelphia.

References

 Sweeney, M. J. (2002). Taxa Associated with the Family Argonautidae Tryon, 1879. Tree of Life web project.

External links

Information on the genus Argonauta

cornuta
Cephalopods described in 1854
Taxa named by Timothy Abbott Conrad